Warrior was an American privateer. 

Under the command of Guy Champlin, Warrior captured the brig Hope, the 4-gun convict transport Francis and Eliza in January 1815, the 8-gun Neptune, the brig Dundee, and an unknown schooner.

Notes

References
 
 

1810s ships
Privateer ships of the United States